Jack Goes Boating is a 2010 American romantic drama film directed by Philip Seymour Hoffman (in his only career directorial effort) and stars Hoffman in the title role, as well as Amy Ryan, John Ortiz and Daphne Rubin-Vega. The film's script was written by Robert Glaudini, based on his 2007 play Jack Goes Boating. The film's cast was mostly the same as that of the play's premiere at The Public Theater, although Amy Ryan replaced Beth Cole (who has a cameo as a teacher). The film was produced by Overture Films and Relativity Media. It premiered at the 26th Sundance Film Festival and was later released in the United States on September 17, 2010.

Plot
Jack is a shy limousine driver who lives with and works for his uncle. His best friend and co-worker Clyde and Clyde's wife Lucy set up a dinner date at their house with Lucy's new co-worker, Connie, who has intimacy issues of her own.

As Jack and Connie get to know each other, he sets his sights on learning to swim so he can take her boating when summer comes; with Clyde eager to help him learn, they begin swimming lessons. Jack soon decides that summer is too far away to wait for a date with Connie, so he decides that a nice dinner would be a good place to start. When Connie says that no one has ever cooked a meal for her, Jack decides that he wants to be the chef and cook for her. This adds another set of lessons to be learned as Jack does not know how to cook, so Clyde sets Jack up with a chef friend of Lucy's to learn the culinary art form.

As Jack strives to perfect swimming and cooking, he begins to get a look behind the veil of the marriage of his friends, which is straining under the weight of mutual occasional infidelities. As the troubles of their marriage become increasingly apparent, Jack and Connie grow closer: Her general mistrust gradually erodes, and he gains confidence and skill in relating to her and in pursuing his dream job. The film's last scene has Jack and Connie walking off happily, as a newly single Clyde looks on ambivalently.

Cast
Philip Seymour Hoffman as Jack
Amy Ryan as Connie
John Ortiz as Clyde
Daphne Rubin-Vega as Lucy
Thomas McCarthy as Dr. Bob
Salvatore Inzerillo as Cannoli
Richard Petrocelli as Uncle Frank
 Harry Seddon as the Teacher
Lola Glaudini as Italian Woman
Stephen Adly Guirgis as MTA worker
Elizabeth Rodriguez as Waldorf Event Assistant
Isaac Schinazi as Pastry Chef
Mason Pettit as Drunk Man on Subway

Production
Robert Glaudini’s play was originally performed in 2007 by the LAByrinth Theater Company, with Hoffman, Ortiz and Rubin-Vega performing in the same roles that they play in the film version.

The film was co-financed by Overture Films (known for The Men Who Stare at Goats and Law Abiding Citizen) and Big Beach Films (known for Little Miss Sunshine and Away We Go). In addition to directing and acting, Hoffman acted as one of the two executive producers with the other being costar John Ortiz.

Pre-production and development for the film took place in January 2009. Filming began in New York in February 2009. The Clinton Diner of Maspeth, Queens in New York City is a featured location in the film. Post-production took place in October 2009 and the film was completed in March 2010.

Release
The film premiered on January 23, 2010 at the 26th Sundance Film Festival. It was later distributed by Overture Films and Relativity Media and it was released on four screens in New York City and Los Angeles on September 17, 2010. It opened to $28,916 for a $7,229 per screen average. In September and October, the film expanded reaching a maximum of 90 screens. The film's domestic theatrical run came to an end in December 2010,  with the domestic gross totaling $541,992. The film was later released on DVD on January 18, 2011.

Outside of the U.S, the film was featured in a number of foreign film festivals including the Toronto International Film Festival, the Torino Film Festival, the Tokyo International Film Festival, and the Dubai International Film Festival. The film grossed $95,487 overseas, bringing its current global total gross to $637,479. It was later released in the United Kingdom on November 4, 2011.

Reception

Critical reception
On Rotten Tomatoes, the film has an approval rating 68% based on 105 reviews, with an average rating of 6.3/10. The site's critical consensus reads, "It's made the journey from stage to screen somewhat worse for wear, but Jack Goes Boating remains a sensitive, well-acted character study."  On Metacritic the film has a score of 64 out of 100 based on 27 critics, indicating "generally favorable reviews".

It was especially noted for the performances of the four leading actors, and was compared favorably with similar romantic films from the 1950s, such as Marty (1955). Simon Hattenstone of The Guardian also called the film "refreshing" as it showed Hoffman playing for a change "a regular dysfunctional guy rather than a freaky dysfunctional guy". Linda Barnard of the Toronto Star said "the dialogue makes the movie feel more a creature of stage than screen", but also noted, "The performances are ego-free and often funny", and concluded "Hoffman admirably works both sides of the camera with Jack Goes Boating, a reminder that love is indeed where you find it and works best when we don’t look too closely."

Awards
Jack Goes Boating was nominated for four major awards in 2010. For his performance as Clyde, John Ortiz was nominated for a Gotham Award in the category of Breakthrough Actor. The award went to Ronald Bronstein for his performance in Daddy Longlegs. The film was also nominated for three Independent Spirit Awards. John Ortiz was again nominated for his performance in the Best Supporting Male category but lost to John Hawkes in Winter's Bone. Daphne Rubin-Vega was also nominated for her performance as Lucy in the Best Supporting Female category but lost to Dale Dickey in Winter's Bone. Robert Glaudini was nominated in the Best First Screenplay category but lost to Lena Dunham for Tiny Furniture.

Soundtrack
A soundtrack album for the film featuring the following songs is available from Lakeshore Records.

References

External links

Jack Goes Boating at Metacritic

2010 romantic comedy films
2010 films
American romantic comedy films
2010 directorial debut films
American films based on plays
Films shot in New York City
Films set in New York City
Big Beach (company) films
2010 independent films
2010s English-language films
2010s American films